Yixianopterus is a pterodactyloid pterosaur genus from the Barremian-Aptian-age Lower Cretaceous Yixian Formation of Liaoning, China. It is known from a single specimen, holotype JZMP-V-12, housed at the Benxi Geological Museum. This specimen was doctored before acquisition, with much of the skull being fabricated.

Classification
Lü et al. (2006) assigned Yixianopterus to the lophocratian family Lonchodectidae on the basis of dental characters, classifying it as the first Asian representative of Lonchodectidae. Martill (2011) considered it potentially related to his new taxon Unwindia, and Witton (2013) assigned it to the family Ornithocheiridae.

A reappraisal of the holotype specimen and phylogenetic analysis by Jiang et al. (2020) recovered Yixianopterus as a basal member of the clade Istiodactyliformes:

References

Early Cretaceous pterosaurs of Asia
Yixian fauna
Fossil taxa described in 2006
Taxa named by Lü Junchang
Pteranodontoids